Nieuwerbrug (also Nieuwerbrug aan de Rijn) is a village in the Dutch province of South Holland. It is a part of the former municipality of Bodegraven, and lies about five kilometres west of Woerden. Bodegraven has become part of the municipality of Bodegraven-Reeuwijk in 2011. Nieuwerbrug aan de Rijn is the spelling since 2009 to distinguish from Nieuwebrug in Friesland.

Nieuwerbrug is a dike village which developed along the bridge over the Oude Rijn which was built in 1510. The bridge became a toll bridge from 1651 to the present. A little tower was built next to the bridge between 1913 and 1914.

Gallery

References

Bodegraven-Reeuwijk
Populated places in South Holland